Danse Manatee is the first collaborative studio album between Avey Tare, Panda Bear, and Geologist, released in July 2001 on the label Catsup Plate. It was later retroactively classified as the second studio album by their band Animal Collective.

Background
Only one thousand copies were made for the Catsup Plate release, but it was reissued as a double CD along with Spirit They're Gone, Spirit They've Vanished in 2003 on FatCat Records. Band member Geologist, who joined Avey Tare and Panda Bear for the first time on this release, has said that this is perhaps his favorite Animal Collective album, despite its general lack of popularity among fans and critics.

The album was recorded in many different locations, including Avey's parent's house, the house the band shared in Brooklyn Heights, and Geologist's college dorm room and radio station. To create the sounds the group made use of guitar, synths, samples, and did percussion with whatever was lying around.

The band's goal in the recording and production of the album was to experiment with extreme frequencies and how they were perceived by the listener. This created a challenge during the mastering process, as they could not raise the volume of the whole mix without causing the sounds to digitally distort. Geologist had this to say about the recording of the album on the Collected Animals forum:

For the Spirit/Danse reissue on FatCat Records, Danse Manatee was remastered by Sung Tongs producer Rusty Santos.

"Essplode" and "Lablakely Dress" were later re-worked as a mashup with "Fireworks" from Strawberry Jam for live performances during 2007 through 2009.

Track listing

Personnel
Avey Tare - guitar, vocals, synthesizers, electronics, percussion
Panda Bear - vocals, synthesizers, electronics, percussion
Geologist - MiniDiscs, synthesizers, electronics, percussion

References

2001 albums
Animal Collective albums
New Weird America albums
FatCat Records albums
Panda Bear (musician) albums